Sir Thomas Lawrence (1769–1830) was a British artist and President of Royal Academy.

Thomas Lawrence may also refer to:
Thomas Lawrence (field hockey), Malaysian Olympic hockey player
Thomas Lawrence (MP), Member of Parliament for Lancashire, 1445
Thomas Lawrence (mayor) (1689–1754), mayor of colonial Philadelphia
Thomas Lawrence (physician) (1711–1783), English President of the Royal College of Physicians
T. E. Lawrence (1888–1935), "Lawrence of Arabia"
Thomas Lawrence (Governor of Maryland) (1645–1714), Royal Governor of Maryland, 1693
Tommy Lawrence (1940–2018), Scottish footballer
Tom Lawrence (born 1994), footballer

See also
 Thomas Laurence (1598–1657), English theologian, sometimes spelled this way
 Thomas St Lawrence (disambiguation)